David Melnyk (born December 15, 1950), known professionally as Jim Van Horne, is a Canadian former sports anchor.

Broadcasting career

Radio
Melnyk began his broadcasting career on CKMP in Midland, Ontario, in 1971. 
From 1972 to 1980, Van Horne was one of the top disc jockeys in Canada at 1050 CHUM in Toronto. It was when he was hired at CHUM he changed his name to Jim Van Horne when Dave Melnyk was deemed to be not rock’n’roll enough. He was named Billboard Magazine's Disc Jockey of the year in 1972, the only Canadian to ever claim the honour.

Switch to television
From 1980 to 1984, he was the late night sports anchor for CFAC television in Calgary, while hosting the Calgary Flames' NHL broadcasts. Van Horne became one of the most trusted and recognizable sports personalities in Canada, sporting his trademark walrus-size moustache and easy-going on-air personality.

He moved on to a long tenure with TSN where he was the primetime sports-anchor from the beginning of that sports network's history in 1984 until 2001. During his time on TSN, he covered numerous events including NHL hockey, alpine skiing, boxing, tennis, swimming, bowling, golf, and equestrian.

Van Horne has broadcast from five Olympic games, including 1988 in Calgary, covering alpine skiing, 2000 in Sydney covering tennis, 2008 in Beijing, assigned to baseball and softball, and 2010 Vancouver, mentoring the commentators from APTN, the Aboriginal Peoples Television Network, and worked in 2018 Pyeongchang on the worldwide live stream.

Current projects
Van Horne is now well into “semi” retirement but continues to work the Olympic Games with OBS and is a regular contributor to AMI as a weekly narrator on “The Guardian This Week” and a variety of voice over projects.

Quotes
While on SportsDesk, Van Horne used two sayings to start the telecast on Wednesdays and Fridays:
 Wednesdays: "It's the mid-week version."
 Fridays: "'Who-Ha! The weekend is here!"

References

External links
 Jim van Horne
 
 A Tale of Two Hosts (UBC article on Jody Vance & Jim Van Horne)

1950 births
Canadian radio sportscasters
Canadian television sportscasters
Living people
People from Toronto
National Hockey League broadcasters
Olympic Games broadcasters
Tennis commentators
Golf writers and broadcasters
Skiing announcers
Baseball announcers
Bowling broadcasters
Boxing commentators